The Cornell Review is an independent newspaper published by students of Cornell University in Ithaca, New York. With the motto, "We Do Not Apologize," the Review has a  history in conservative journalism and was once one of the leading college conservative publications in the United States. While the ideological makeup of its staff shifts over the years, the paper has consistently accused Cornell of adhering to left-wing politics and political correctness, delivered with a signature anti-establishment tone.

History

Founding
The Cornell Review was founded on Cornell's Ithaca campus in 1984. Jim Keller, a government major, founded The Cornell Review during his senior year in the spring of 1984. The paper drew immediate and critical attention for its discordant rhetoric and "shock journalism." Ann Coulter, then an undergraduate in the history department of the College of Arts and Sciences, served as its editor during the fall of 1984.

Much of the paper's structure in the early years was influenced by the unanticipated success of the Dartmouth Review at Dartmouth College, which inspired conservative students at other institutions to found similar newspapers. The Institute for Educational Affairs, founded in 1978 to assist conservative academics, created The Collegiate Network in 1984 to offer these groups technical and financial assistance.

During the 1980s the Review targeted affirmative action, gay rights, communist sympathizers, abortion, and anti-apartheid activists, while defending the Reagan Administration, the Greek system, and the university administration (against striking workers). It notably criticized university-sponsored ethnicity-oriented residential communities, known as "program houses," as segregationist.

In 1986, some students voiced their opposition to the paper by seeking out and shredding nearly every copy of one issue at a multitude of locations on campus during the early morning hours after delivery.

Merger with Cornell American
In 1992, before the Review had backed down from its more controversial positions, a deliberately unsensational rival publication began printing called The Cornell American. It became the demesne of social conservatives until it ceased publishing in 1996.

In 2003 and 2004, successive editors began a controversial revamp of the Review, swinging it toward a more libertarian conservatism and a more neutral editorial position.  In response, former Review writer and activist Ryan Horn resurrected a new Cornell American to take up the social conservatism from which the Review had distanced itself.  The Cornell Review and the Cornell American had switched roles: the Review had become the calmer and lower profile paper, and the American the more traditional.

Rivalry between the Review and the American began to die down during the ensuing years as the staffs of the respective papers changed and the editorial positions of both papers began to converge. In April 2007, students from the Review and the American agreed to merge the two papers in the interest of preserving a conservative voice on campus. The Review assumed the American'''s slogan: "Limited Government, Traditional Values, America First." It then reverted to the original Review slogan, "The Conservative Voice on Campus," until it changed to "We Do Not Apologize" in late 2014. The change was made due to the growing libertarian nature of the newspaper's staff and editorial stance.

Turn of the 21st Century
The Review was embroiled in several controversies in the 1990s. In 1993, its funding was threatened after it printed a cartoon critical of President Bill Clinton's move to permit homosexuals in the U.S. military which was widely called homophobic.

In 1997, the Review printed an anonymous editorial lampooning the Oakland, California school district's move to teach in African-American English (AAE). Entitled "So U Be Wantin' to Take Dis Class," it presented a mock catalogue of courses taught in a pastiche of AAE, for instance "Da white man be evil an he tryin' to keep da brotherman down. We's got Sharpton and Farrakhan so who da...man now, white boy." A student protest followed in which a number of copies of the Review were burned. The editors defended the editorial as satire and criticized the burning as suppression of free speech.

The Review historically prints pieces that bring great debate and controversy. In the autumn of 2002, Cornell Review Online published a column by Elliott Reed whose Good Vibrations piece exposed a coverup of vibrators to be sold at the campus health center.  Reed discovered an email to a listserv which claimed the health center had agreed to sell vibrators and solicited comments from female students.  The university claimed the email "jumped the gun," as no decision had been made at that time.  The Review was awarded a "Campus Outrage" nod from the conservative organization, Accuracy in Academia, for the piece.

Obama Administration
The Review found itself in uncharted territory in 2008, with the election of 2008 and a national trend toward more liberal thinking. It marked the first time since 2001 that a Democratic president had been in office, but for the Review, the election of Barack Obama marked a greater shift on Cornell's campus. The Review conducted a poll in 2012 that found that 60% of Cornell students that were registered to vote would be voting for Obama, compared to 14% for Mitt Romney.

Cornell Insider
In December 2008, The Cornell Review started its blog, Cornell Insider. It is primarily focused on breaking campus events.

The Insider has been linked by blogs of all sizes, including IvyGate. Legal Insurrection, Campus Reform, The website also broke stories that were followed by media outlets such as The Hill, RealClearPolitics and The O'Reilly Factor.

Management and operations
The Review was incorporated in 1986 as The Ithaca Review, Inc. The editorial staff is headed by an undergraduate editor-in-chief, while the business staff is headed by an undergraduate president.

Funding for the Review comes primarily from the Collegiate Network, a syndicate of conservative campus newspapers funded by the Intercollegiate Studies Institute.

Notable alumni
 Ann Coulter – conservative social and political commentator
 Jamie Weinstein – Senior Editor on The Daily Caller Kenneth K. Lee – United States Circuit Judge

See also

 Collegiate Network
 Cornell University
 Cornell Daily Sun
 Dartmouth Review
 Stanford Review

Footnotes

External links
 The Cornell Review Official Website post-2016 The Cornell Review Official Website pre-2016 Cornell American, Cornell Review Merge Hentoff, Nat.  "Setting Fire to Offensive Ideas," The Village Voice, September 24, 1997
 Ruby-Sachs, Emma and Waligore, Timothy. "A Once-Bright Star Dims," The Nation, February 17, 2003.
 The Cornell American: Taking a positive course To Do a New Review Cornell Review's Decline Chalkings Offend Ujamaa Residents''

Cornell University publications
Student newspapers published in New York (state)
Conservative magazines published in the United States
Libertarian publications
1984 establishments in New York (state)
Publications established in 1984